is a 2015 Japanese drama film directed by Yoji Yamada and starring Sayuri Yoshinaga and Kazunari Ninomiya. It was selected as the Japanese entry for the Best Foreign Language Film at the 89th Academy Awards but it was not nominated.

Plot
Midwife Nobuko Fukuhara lost her husband and eldest son during World War II and lost her youngest son, Koji, as a result of the bombing of Nagasaki. Following the war, she has been living alone with only work to keep her occupied. However, one day she is visited by an apparition of Koji. The mother and son begin to spend much time together, reminiscing and catching up on lost time. Although these moments together make both of them happy, it leads Nobuko to reflect more on her losses and the relationship she has with Koji's fiancée Machiko.

Cast
 Sayuri Yoshinaga as  Nobuko Fukuhara
 Kazunari Ninomiya as Koji Fukuhara
 Haru Kuroki as Machiko Sata
 Kenichi Kato as "Shanghai Uncle"
 Tadanobu Asano as Kuroda
 Yuriko Hirooka as Tomie
 Miyu Honda as Tamiko
 Christopher McCombs as Charles Sweeney
 Nenji Kobayashi as Demobilized Officer
 Kazunaga Tsuji as Senior Man
 Isao Hashizume as Kawakami Professor

Production

Filming
Principal photography began on 26 April 2015 in Nagasaki and was completed on 11 July 2015.

Music
The musical score for Nagasaki was composed by Ryuichi Sakamoto. A soundtrack album was released by Milan Records on 23 September 2016.

Reception

Box office
Nagasaki: Memories of My Son grossed ¥1.98 billion in Japan.

Accolades

See also
 List of submissions to the 89th Academy Awards for Best Foreign Language Film
 List of Japanese submissions for the Academy Award for Best Foreign Language Film

References

External links
 

2015 films
2015 drama films
Japanese drama films
2010s Japanese-language films
Films directed by Yoji Yamada
Films scored by Ryuichi Sakamoto
2010s Japanese films